IFK Göteborg finished just 7th in Allsvenskan. Just managing to finish on the top half of the table. Starting the season with a loss in Supercupen to AIK, and was then briefly involved in a relegation battle, until the World Cup break offered the squad to regroup and had a stronger autumn season.

Squad

Goalkeepers
  August Strömberg
  Erik Dahlin
  Markus Sandberg

Defenders
  Karl Svensson
  Nicklas Carlsson
  Petter Björlund
  Adam Johansson
  Ragnar Sigurðsson
  Hjálmar Jónsson
  Erik Lund
  Sebastian Eriksson
  Mikael Dyrestam

Midfielders
  Thomas Olsson
  Stefan Selaković
  Jakob Johansson
  Tobias Sana
  Teddy Bjarnason
  Pär Ericsson

Attackers
  Tobias Hysén
  Robin Söder
  Hannes Stiller
  Niklas Bärkroth

Competitions

Allsvenskan

League table

Matches

IFK Göteborg seasons
IFK Goteborg